Catrìona Lexy Chaimbeul (born 1982), also known as Catriona Lexy Campbell, is a Scottish poet, novelist, dramatist, and actor, working mainly in Scottish Gaelic.

Life
Chaimbeul was born into a well-known literary family in Ness, Lewis. Her father, Tormod Caimbeul (also known as Tormod a' Bhocsair and Norman Campbell), and her uncle Alasdair Caimbeul are both published writers in Gaelic, as was her grandfather Aonghas Caimbeul (Am Bocsair) and her great-uncle, war poet and award-winning memoirist, Aonghas Caimbeul (Am Puilean). Her mother, Mary Jane Campbell, is a Gaelic Traditional singer.

Chaimbeul attended the University of Edinburgh (M.A. in Mental Philosophy). She worked as an actor and tutor in Gaelic drama, including two years with Eden Court Theatre in Inverness as the Gaelic Drama Artist for Skye and Lochalsh, and in 2011-12 was the Gaelic Associate Artist at the National Theatre of Scotland. The family's connection with Sabhal Mòr Ostaig, the National Centre for the Gaelic Language and Culture, now part of the University of the Highlands and Islands, has included periods as writer-in-residence for both Tormod and Alasdair Caimbeul, and Mary Jane is a lecturer at the centre. In January 2013 Catrìona was appointed for a one-year term as writer-in-residence at Sabhal Mòr.

Prizes and awards
2006 Wigtown Book Festival Gaelic poetry prize

Bibliography
Chaimbeul has described the major themes of her work as being "inter-personal relationships, secrets and lies, and the supernatural".

Novels:
 (as Catriona Lexy Campbell)

Children's books:

Stage plays:

Educational publications:

In December 2012 BBC Scotland broadcast a play based on her novel Samhraidhean Dìomhair.

References

1983 births
Living people
Scottish Gaelic women poets
Scottish Gaelic poets
21st-century Scottish Gaelic poets
Scottish Gaelic dramatists and playwrights
Scottish women dramatists and playwrights
Scottish Gaelic novelists
Alumni of the University of Edinburgh
Sabhal Mòr Ostaig
People from the Isle of Lewis
21st-century Scottish dramatists and playwrights
21st-century Scottish writers
21st-century Scottish women writers
Scottish Gaelic women writers
Scottish Gaelic writers
21st-century Scottish actresses